Family Relations is a 1981 Soviet drama film directed by Nikita Mikhalkov.

Plot
A rural woman Mariya Konovalova (Nonna Mordyukova) goes to the regional center to visit her daughter Nina (Svetlana Kryuchkova), and beloved granddaughter Irishka (Fedor Stukov). A good and simple-minded woman can not imagine what kind of world they are living - the dearest and, perhaps, the only people close to her. Trying to deal with their ideas about life and being willing to improve her daughter's difficult relationship with her ex-husband, she brings them all to a lot of grief.

Cast
 Nonna Mordyukova as Maria Konovalova 
 Svetlana Kryuchkova as Nina, Maria's daughter
 Yuri Bogatyryov as Tasik, Nina's husband
 Andrei Petrov as Liapin, Maria's fellow traveler
 Fyodor Stukov as Irishka, Nina's daughter
 Ivan Bortnik as Vovchik, Maria's ex-husband
 Oleg Menshikov as Kirill, Vovchik's son
 Vsevolod Larionov as Lieutenant-General in the train
 Nikita Mikhalkov as waiter
 Aleksandr Adabashyan as Sanya the Waiter / man with glass at the train station

Production
The main part of the film was shot in Dnepropetrovsk, nowadays - Dnipro, Ukraine, scenes in the restaurant — in Pushchino (Moscow Oblast), runner — at the Olimpiyskiy National Sports Complex in Kyiv.

References

External links

1981 drama films
1981 films
Soviet drama films
Films shot in Ukraine
Films directed by Nikita Mikhalkov
Films scored by Eduard Artemyev
Mosfilm films
1980s Russian-language films